The American Hellenic Institute (AHI) is a Greek American organization created in 1974 to strengthen US-Greece and US-Cyprus relations, as well as relations within Hellenic-American community.  The group has a lobbying focus, which distinguishes it from the other organizations associated with AHI.

History
The American Hellenic Institute was created on August 1, 1974, by Eugene Rossides in response to the Turkish occupation of Cyprus.  The Institute argued that Turkey had violated the US Foreign Assistance Act of 1961 and Foreign Military Sales Act, in that Turkish forces were purportedly using American weapons.  They called upon Henry Kissinger, who would be a perennial obstacle to the AHI's goals, to condemn Turkey and to deny it further sales and aid until all Turkish troops were withdrawn from the soil of Cyprus.  This petition was denied, but under continued pressure from AHI, Congress decided on an arms embargo toward Turkey.  In December 1974, an AHI-sponsored $25 million Congressional aid package to Cyprus was approved.

Other groups under the American Hellenic Institute
Other groups include:
AHI Business Network (created in 1989)
American Hellenic Institute Foundation, Inc. (AHIF, a think tank created in 1975)
Foundation for Hellenic Studies (created in 1995)

Major activities (including those taken as part of AHI)

AHI has been a part of many political activities and lobbying actions. Representatives of AHI have testified before Congress with great frequency on topics related to their interests, usually foreign aid proposals for Cyprus, Greece, Albania, Turkey, or the Republic of North Macedonia.

AHI was integral in the movement to change the 7:10 power-sharing ratio on Cyprus to 1:1, which they perceived as more equitable.  AHI both opposed American support of the 2004 Annan Plan for unification of Cyprus, calling the plan "undemocratic" and "unworkable."  Each presidential election year, a policy statement is sent to the candidates by AHI and its affiliates informing them of issues of interest to the Greek-American community.  In September 2008, the American Hellenic Institute contacted all members of the Senate Foreign Relations Committee, asking them to submit questions about American policy toward Cyprus to the new US Ambassador to Turkey, James F. Jeffrey.  AHI has sponsored legislative conferences, notably in 1997, when three one-day Legislative Policy Conferences were held in New York City, Los Angeles, and Chicago to highlight contributions by grassroots activists in the Greek-American community and to coordinate stances among Greek-American groups.

Notable members
Nick Larigakis, President and COO of AHI, is also the founder and president of NL Group, LLC, a business and government consulting group for Greek-American issues.
Nick Karembelas, AHI legal counsel as of 2000, is a partner at Sfikas & Karambelas law office and was highly active in representing Greek Cypriot families who wished to sue Turkey for loss of property and Assyrians looking to claim compensation for lost property in northern Iraq.
Nick Chimicles, AHI Chairman as of 2000, is a senior partner in Chimicles & Tikellis LLP, a class action law firm based in Pennsylvania and Delaware with a nationwide practice.
Savas Tsivicos, a former AHI chairman, is the National Chairman and President of the Cyprus Children's Fund, a New York-based non-profit established in 1975 to support Cypriot children in need.
Eugene Rossides, founder of the American Hellenic Institute, received the Homeric Award in January 2008 from the Chian Federation, an organization of Greek-Americans from the island of Chios, in honor of his achievements in strengthening United States-Greece relations and supporting human rights. Rossides was a lawyer at Rogers & Wells, and the first Greek-American to be appointed and confirmed to the United States Senate. He also served as Assistant Secretary of the US Treasury during the Nixon Administration.

Major issues of concern

The issues outlined in the AHI policy letters sent to presidential candidates Obama and McCain were typical of policy points that AHI advocates.  First and foremost was the question of American policy on Cyprus.  The removal of all Turkish troops and the peaceful unification of the island feature prominently as goals in most Greek-American lobbying.  In the event of continued Turkish military presence on Cyprus, AHI advised the application of economic sanctions and an arms embargo against Turkey because of restriction of human rights and lack of cooperation with American aims.

The letter also called for reinforcement of maritime borders and airspace in the Aegean, which Turkey has purportedly repeatedly violated.  AHI also urges the Republic of Macedonia to negotiate in good faith with Greece to resolve the name issue and find a mutually-acceptable solution to the name to be used by the Republic of Macedonia for all purposes. AHI maintains that the Republic of Macedonia should immediately cease their propaganda against Greece, propaganda which violates the U.N.-brokered Interim Accord between the Republic of Macedonia and Greece, as stated in Article 7 paragraph 1 of the Accord which was signed in New York, September 13, 1995. Since antiquity the name Macedonia has referred to a geographical region and not to a nationality. Geographic Macedonia is within the borders of at least three countries. Only a small portion of geographic Macedonia lies within the Republic of Macedonia, whose population is one-third Albanian and two-thirds Slavic in origin, yet the government of the Republic of Macedonia continues to make territorial claims on parts of Greece (the largest part of geographic Macedonia lies within Greece in the Greek province of Macedonia). Finally, the policy letters strongly suggested the inclusion of Greece in the American visa waiver program and the application of American pressure to ensure protection of the Ecumenical Patriarch of Constantinople and Greek Orthodox theological centers in Turkey.

Changes in level of influence
AHI reached its peak of power in the late 1970s, due to the urgency of the situation on Cyprus at the time, in accordance with the theory of functionalism.  Additional factors in AHI's high levels of influence at the time include the demise of the divisive Greek junta, a "new wave" of Greek immigration to the US, and the placement of many Greek-Americans in high levels in American politics and business.  The organization did, however, face considerable opposition from the executive branch of government, notably as represented in the person of Henry Kissinger.  By the 1980s and after, AHI had declined somewhat in influence, although, as mentioned earlier, they continued to be active in the political arena.  Their relative decline can be attributed to a variety of factors, among them the fact that the Greek-American community had more issues by then to collectively tackle than that of the Cyprus conflict.

See also
 American Hellenic Educational Progressive Association
 Cyprus dispute
 Lobbying in the United States
 Greek American
 Diaspora politics in the United States
 Macedonia naming dispute

References

External links
 Official site

Organizations established in 1974
Cyprus–United States relations
Greece–United States relations
Ethnicity in politics
Turkey–United States relations
Foreign policy lobbying organizations in the United States
1974 establishments in the United States
Organizations based in Washington, D.C.